Glayva is a liqueur originally produced in 1947 in Leith, Edinburgh, Scotland by Ronald Morrison & Co Ltd and now by Whyte and Mackay Ltd. 

Glayva is made from a blend of aged Scotch whiskies, a selected range of spices, Mediterranean tangerines, cinnamon, almonds and honey. It has a deep golden colour and a distinctive flavour.

History

Glayva was first produced and sold in 1947 by wine and whisky merchant Ronald Morrison. Like Drambuie, its ingredients include honey and spices mixed with Scotch malt whisky. The name originates from a Gaelic phrase, "Glè Mhath", meaning "very good".

See also
List of liqueurs

References

External links
Glayva's official website

Liqueurs
Scottish liqueurs
Scottish brands
Leith
1947 establishments in Scotland
Products introduced in 1947
Honey liqueurs and spirits
Scottish distilled drinks